

Security studies, also known as international security studies, is an academic sub-field within the wider discipline of international relations that studies organized violence, military conflict, national security, and international security.

While the field (much like its parent field of international relations) is often meant to educate students who aspire to professional careers in think tanks, consulting, defense contractors, Human Rights NGOs or in government service positions focused on diplomacy, foreign policy, conflict resolution and prevention, emergency and disaster management, intelligence, and defense, it can also be tailored to students seeking to professionally conduct academic research within academia, or as public intellectuals, pundits or journalists writing about security policy.

History
The origin of the modern field of security studies has been traced to the period between World War I and World War II. Quincy Wright's 1942 book, Study of War, was the culmination of a major collaborative research project dating back to 1926. Scholars such as William T. R. Fox, Bernard Brodie, Harold Lasswell, Eugene Staley, Jacob Viner, and Vernon Van Dyke were involved in the project. Security studies courses were introduced at Columbia University, Princeton, the University of North Carolina, Northwestern, Yale, and the University of Pennsylvania in the 1940s. Think tanks, such as the RAND Corporation, played an influential role in post-WWII security studies in the United States. The field rapidly developed within international relations during the Cold War, examples from the era including the academic works of mid-20th century realist political scientists such as Thomas Schelling and Henry Kissinger, who focused primarily on nuclear deterrence. 

Some scholars have called for expanding security studies to include topics such as economic security, environmental security and public health. Stephen Walt has argued against this expansion, saying it would undermine the field's intellectual coherence. While the field is mostly contained within political science and public policy programs, it is increasingly common to take an interdisciplinary approach, incorporating knowledge from the fields of history, geography (stressing classical geopolitics), military sciences, and criminology.

The field of security studies is related to strategic studies and military science, both of which are frequently published in security studies journals.

Journals
International Security and Security Studies are the most prominent journals dedicated specifically to security studies. Other security studies  journals include:
 African Security
 Armed Forces & Society
 Asian Security
 Civil Wars
 Comparative Strategy
 Conflict Management and Peace  Science
 Contemporary Security Policy
 Defence and Peace Economics
 Defence Studies
 European Security
 European Journal of International Security
 Intelligence and National Security
 International Peacekeeping
 Journal of Conflict Resolution
 Journal of Global Security Studies
 Journal of Peace Research
 Journal of Strategic Studies
 Naval War College Review
 Parameters
 Perspectives on Terrorism
 Security Dialogue
 Small Wars & Insurgencies
 Strategic Studies Quarterly (renamed "Æther: A Journal of Strategic Airpower & Spacepower" as from 2022)
 Studies in Conflict and Terrorism
 Survival
 Terrorism and Political Violence
 Texas National Security Review
 The RUSI Journal
 The Washington Quarterly

See also

 Human security
 International relations theory
 International security
 Peace and conflict studies
 Critical security studies
 Feminist security studies
 Strategic studies
 Military science

References

Sources
 Williams, Paul (2008) Security Studies: An Introduction, Abingdon: Routledge

 
International relations
International security